
All times shown are US EDT.

Pool play

Pool A

Southeast 3, Mid-Atlantic 2
Game time: August 19 13:00 US EDT

West 1, Great Lakes 0
Game time: August 19 15:10 US EDT

Southeast 4, West 1
Game time: August 20 13:10 US EDT

Great Lakes 1, Mid-Atlantic 0
Game time: August 20 20:10 US EDT

West 4, Mid-Atlantic 1
Game time: August 22 15:10 US EDT

Great Lakes 2, Southeast 0
Game time: August 22 20:16 US EDT

Pool B

New England 6, Northwest 1
Game time: August 18 16:00 US EDT

Southwest 1, Midwest 0
Game time: August 18 20:00 US EDT

Midwest 14, New England 5
Game time: August 20 11:00 US EDT: moved from August 19 at 20:00 due to rain

New England 5, Southwest 0
Game time: August 20 15:00 US EDT

Northwest 2, Midwest 1
Game time: August 21 20:13 US EDT

Pool C

Transatlantic 5, Canada 0
Game time: August 18 18:00 US EDT

Transatlantic 9, Pacific 1
Game time: August 20 18:00 US EDT

Latin America 1, Pacific 0
Game time: August 19 18:00 US EDT: Game resumed on August 21 at 10:00 US EDT.

Latin America 3, Canada 2
Game time: August 21 18:00 US EDT

Canada 2, Pacific 1
Game time: August 22 13:12 US EDT

Latin America 1, Transatlantic 0
Game time: August 22 18:10 US EDT

Pool D

Asia 11, EMEA 0
Game time: August 19 11:00 US EDT

Completed early due to mercy rule

Mexico 3, Caribbean 2
Game time: August 19 16:00 US EDT

Mexico 11, EMEA 1
Game time: August 20 19:00 US EDT

Completed early due to mercy rule

Caribbean 8, EMEA 0
Game time: August 21 11:00 US EDT

Asia 6, Mexico 1
Game time: August 21 13:00 US EDT

Asia 7, Caribbean 2
Game time: August 22 11:11 US EDT

Elimination round

Semifinals

Mexico 11, Latin America 0
Game time: August 23 15:12 US EDT

Northwest 4, Great Lakes 3
Game time: August 23 19:40 US EDT

Asia 4, Transatlantic 1
Game time: August 24 18:00 US EDT

Southeast 8, New England 0
Game time: August 24 19:41 US EDT

Finals

Southeast 7, Northwest 3
Game time: August 26 15:43 US EDT

Asia 3, Mexico 0
Game time: August 26 19:30 US EDT

Consolation Game
Game cancelled due to rain; both Matamoros, Mexico and Beaverton, Oregon shared third place.

Championship Game

Southeast 2, Asia 1
Game time: August 28 20:00 US EDT

Game was postponed due to rain.

External links
Full schedule from littleleague.org

2006 Little League World Series